The 2019 Europe's Strongest Man was a strongman competition that took place in Leeds, England on 6 April 2019 at the First Direct Arena. This event was part of the 2019 Giants live tour.

Results of events

Event 1: Max Log Lift
Notes: A number of athletes were invited to take part in this event only and therefore they did not score points.

Event 2: Deadlift
Weight:  for as many repetitions as possible.
Time Limit: 60 seconds
Notes: This event was completed on an axle bar.

Event 3: Flip and Drag
Weight: 4 x  tyre flips, 1 x anchor drag 
Course Length:

Event 4: Hercules Hold
Weight:  pillars in each hand.

^ Laurence Shahlaei sustained an injury in this event and took no further part in the competition.

Event 5: Atlas Stones

Final results

References

External links 

Competitions in the United Kingdom
Europe's Strongest Man